Cynthiaol is an naturally occurring polyunsaturated fatty alcohol that is thought to be a flavor component of the delicacy known as sea pineapple.

References

Fatty alcohols